The Autorail à Grande Capacité (literally, high-capacity railcar) or AGC is a category of multiple unit train built at Bombardier Transportation's plant in Crespin for the French rail operator SNCF.  Depending on the variants, the train is electric, diesel or dual-mode.

This train (first operated in 2004) has been requested by the region, has been acquired by SNCF in 700 units. Because of this modularity, each region has chosen the cars number (from 2 to 4 in theory, but 3 or 4 in reality) and the interior design (first class, bar area, ski racks, etc.) for their fleet.

The company Remarul 16 Februarie has signed a contract with Bombardier in November 2020, for purchase of license for manufacturing AGC in Romania at Cluj-Napoca. Under the contract, Remarul will exclusively manufacture and sell this train in six countries: Romania, Bulgaria, Greece, Croatia, Bosnia and Serbia.

All the French regions acquired an AGC Class (all variants together). The AGC Class fleet is the most important in 2010. By the fact, with this huge numbers of units in operations, AGC is well implanted in all regions since the 2000s.

History

Contract

Deliveries
The first car delivered was a B 81500, numbered B 81501, and was put into service on February 6, 2004, for TER Midi-Pyrénées service.  The 200th trainset was put into service on November 20, 2006, on the TER Haute-Normandie. The first B 82500 unit was delivered in February 2007 and entered into service on the TER Champagne Ardenne on May 15, 2007.

Variants
The series consists of 4 models:
X 76500: diesel variant, also designated XGC or Diesel AGC
Z 27500: electric variant capable of running on both 1.5 kV DC and 25 kV 50 Hz AC, also designated ZGC or Electric AGC
B 81500: dual-mode variant, capable of running on both diesel (by means of a diesel-electric motor) and 1.5 kV DC (by means of a pantograph), also designated BGC
B 82500: dual-mode variant, capable of running on both diesel (by means of a diesel-electric motor) and 1.5 kV DC or 25 kV (by means of a pantograph), also designated BGC or BiBi (for dual-mode and dual-voltage); these trains are identical to the B 81500-series except for their capability of operating on 1.5 kV DC power. This technology enables the B 82500 to glide seamlessly across the entire French railway network and to access electricity from any available source. This will result in energy savings and reduced greenhouse gas emissions, as well as negating infrastructure constraints and the need for passengers to change trains.

Design

General
Bombardier vehicle design is articulated using bogies between the carriages.

Performances
Depending on configuration, the trains can attain speeds of up to 160 km/h (99 mph). A two-car set diesel variant was initially proposed (with a speed limit of 140 km/h), but none of this variant was acquired by any region.

Operating
The modularity of these trains permits each railroad (or region) to choose the number of units – currently 3 or 4 – that make up the train, as well as the interior layout of the cars (e.g. lounge car, first class, etc.).  Trains can also be made up of mixed units, i.e. a train can be made up from both BGC and ZGC units.  Basse-Normandie and Lorraine regions have also ordered sets that consist of both diesel and electric units (i.e. XGC and ZGC).  A two-unit variant has never been ordered; the B 82500 is only available in a four-unit version.

Remarkable trains

 "Connected AGC" (in French : AGC Connecté) : since 2009, TER Ocitanie operates an AGC equipped with several sensors and IoT to experiment innovating services in real conditions. With a new onboard/ground communication system, all the data from the sensors and the IoT are sent in real time. On the ground, the collected data are analysed (temperature in the train, water level of the toilets, batteries information, etc.) in order to plan a maintenance operation before the train can be forwarded into a Technicentre(French maintenance Workshop). In the future, these data will be used to create high-performant algorithms to elaborate a predictive maintenance (CBM). This project was developed by SNCF and loT Valley (an association composed of several start-ups specialized on the IoT).

Accidents and incidents
 Accident between a train TER B 82500 and a trailer truck on October 12, 2011 on the crossing n°11 at Saint-Médard-sur-Ile. This accident caused the death of 3 passengers and injuries of others 45 (13 of which seriously). Direct and immediate cause was the stuck truck on the crossing while barrier went down.
 Runaway train TER Z 27500 between Formerie, Serqueux and Sommery on October 20, 2015. This incident occurred after the train hit 2 bovines just after the Formerie station, without causing victims. Direct cause was the loss of all the braking capacity due to the impact.
 Accident between a train TER Z 27500 and a stuck trailer truck on October 16, 2019 on the crossing n°70 at Boulzicourt. This accident caused the derailment of the train. Two peoples were slightly injured as well as the train driver.

Liveries

Models
 The LS Models brand makes a model of the Z 27500, B 81500 et X 76500 in 3 or 4 units version in HO gauge. 
 Different versions of AGC can be downloaded (free or buy) for Train Simulator game.

Future

Battery-operated train (BEMU)
In January 2021, Bombardier signed a new contract to retrofit and introduce a pre-series of five AGC battery-operated trains by 2023, in collaboration with SNCF Voyageurs and five French regions including Auvergne-Rhône-Alpes, Hauts-de-France, Nouvelle-Aquitaine, Occitanie and Provence-Alpes-Côte d'Azur. The 5 dual-mode (electric/diesel) AGC will be modified into battery-operated trains (BEMU) to help decarbonise French rail transport.

The idea is to convert dual-mode (catenary and diesel-powered) high capacity self-propelled trains to dual-mode battery-powered AGCs. This project offers a proof of concept and a way forward to  eliminating diesel trains by 2035, a target set by the French government and SNCF.

Extend railway rolling stock life time
SNCF has announced on March 18, 2021, that 40% of the TER (French commuter rail) fleet will be renovated in the next 10 years, included AGC Class (699 trains) and TER 2N NG Class (232 trains). The most important contract has been signed on March 18, 2021, with the Grand Est region.

After about 20 years of operation, the trains need to be entirely checked and modernized in order to continue to be safely operated for 15 to 20 years with better comfort for passengers. This maintenance is an opportunity to improve energy consumption of the train for ecology and durability in mind.
Furthermore, region can choose to upgrade the train with new functionalities for the passengers: aesthetic, comfort, better accessibility, electrical outlets on each seat, Wi-fi on board, LED lighting and new passenger information system.

In addition, to reinforce train environmental performances, CO² level regulation for the HVAC system and particulate filters for the Diesel motors will be installed.
Such a maintenance needs to immobilize the train for 10 to 20 weeks (according to the selected option). It's also a chance to modernize the manufacturing tools in the different concerned SNCF maintenance workshops (in French : "Technicentre").

See also
 List of SNCF classes
 Transport express régional
 Régions françaises

References
Notes

Further reading

External links
 Bombardier - Automotrice AGC - France
 Bombardier AGC page
 Personal website about AGC

SNCF multiple units
Bombardier Transportation multiple units
Electric multiple units of France
Diesel multiple units of France
Hybrid multiple units of France